Stigmella nylandriella is a moth of the family Nepticulidae. It is found in all of Europe (except the Iberian Peninsula and the Balkan Peninsula), east to Russia, where it has been recorded from Bryansk, Murmansk, Karelia, Leningrad and Voronezh.

The wingspan is 4–5 mm. The head is ferruginous yellowish to brown, collar whitish. Antennal eyecaps whitish. Forewings light shining ochreous-grey, apex somewhat darker. Hindwings pale grey. Adults are on wing in May and June.

The larvae feed on Sorbus aria, Sorbus aucuparia and Sorbus domestica. They mine the leaves of their host plant. The mine consists of a long, gradually widening corridor that often closely follows the leaf margin for a long distance. At first, the frass is concentrated in a broad central line, but becomes coiled later.

Etymology
The name honours William Nylander.

References

External links

Fauna Europaea
bladmineerders.nl
Swedish moths
UKmoths
Stigmella nylandriella images at  Consortium for the Barcode of Life
Nepticulidae from the Volga and Ural region
lepiforum.de

Nepticulidae
Moths of Europe
Moths described in 1848